Intelectin 2 is a protein that in humans is encoded by the ITLN2 gene.

Human intelectin-2 has non-conserved ligand binding site substitutions compared to human intelectin-1, thus these two intelectins may not have the same metal ion requirements and ligand specificity. Likewise, there are also ligand binding site residue variations between human and mouse intelectin-2 with no known biochemical and functional consequences.

See also 
 Intelectin

References